Glencorse railway station served the parish of Glencorse, Midlothian, Scotland, from 1877 to 1959 on the Edinburgh, Loanhead and Roslin Railway.

History 
The station was opened as Glencross on 2 July 1877 by the Edinburgh, Loanhead and Roslin Railway. It was situated on a footpath near the A701. Its name was changed to Glencorse in December 1877, as suggested by John Inglis. There was suggestion that the name should be changed to Greenlaw but that would have caused confusion with the station of the same name. On the platform was the station building, which had a waiting room, toilets and a booking office. The stationmaster's house was behind this. At the south end of the platform was the signal box, which controlled access to the goods yard. The yard had two sidings, one serving a loading dock. To the south were further sidings that served Mauricewood Colliery. Passenger numbers slowly dropped after 1905 so it closed on 1 May 1933 but it remained open for goods traffic. The signal box closed in 1934 and the waiting room section of the station building was demolished. Although it had closed to regular passengers, there were weekly recreational passenger trains that started from 2 October 1943 and ended on 29 August 1959. The station closed to goods traffic on 1 July 1959. The track was lifted shortly after. The station buildings were demolished in 1973 and the stationmaster's house was beyond repair. Most of the site has been landscaped and there is a house nearby.

References 

Disused railway stations in Midlothian
Railway stations in Great Britain opened in 1877
Railway stations in Great Britain closed in 1933
1877 establishments in Scotland
1959 disestablishments in Scotland